Edward Louis Voytek (April 4, 1935 – January 16, 2016) was a National Football League (NFL) guard for the Washington Redskins.  He played college football at Purdue University and was drafted in the 22nd round of the 1957 NFL Draft.

Voytek died on January 16, 2016, in Independence, Missouri.

Early and personal life
Voytek was born on April 4, 1935, in Cleveland, Ohio to parents John and Helen Voytek. He graduated from Notre Dame-Cathedral Latin School, and then attended Purdue University, where he played football. After his playing career, he went back to Purdue in order to pursue further education and received his doctorate in veterinary medicine in 1962.

Playing career
Voytek was drafted in 1957 by the Washington Redskins during the 22nd round. He wore No. 66, and appeared in 24 games during the 1957 and 1958 seasons.

References

External links
 

1935 births
2016 deaths
American football offensive guards
Purdue Boilermakers football players
Washington Redskins players
Players of American football from Cleveland